Hong Myong-gum (born 10 July 1986) is a North Korean footballer who plays as a defender for the North Korea women's national football team. She was part of the team at the 2007 FIFA Women's World Cup. At the club level, she plays for Amrokgang in North Korea.

References

External links
 

1986 births
Living people
North Korean women's footballers
North Korea women's international footballers
Place of birth missing (living people)
2007 FIFA Women's World Cup players
Women's association football defenders